Government Sanskrit College, Tripunithura, is a general degree college located in Tripunithura, Kerala. It was established in 1914 and is affiliated with Mahatma Gandhi University. This college offers different courses in Sanskrit literature.

Accreditation
The college is  recognized by the University Grants Commission (UGC).

References

External links
http://www.govtsanskritcollegetpra.edu.in

Universities and colleges in Kochi
Educational institutions established in 1914
1914 establishments in India
Colleges affiliated to Mahatma Gandhi University, Kerala
Arts and Science colleges in Kerala